Dr. Joseph P. and Effie Porth House, also known as the William Porth House and Colonial Tea Room, is a historic home located at Jefferson City, Cole County, Missouri. The original building was built between 1827 and 1842, and the mansard roof was added between 1885 and 1888.  It is a square two-story limestone house with partial walkout basement on the front facade.  It features a bracketed cornice and an iron balcony between the basement and first floor.

It was listed on the National Register of Historic Places in 2001.

References

Houses on the National Register of Historic Places in Missouri
Second Empire architecture in Missouri
Houses completed in 1842
Buildings and structures in Jefferson City, Missouri
National Register of Historic Places in Cole County, Missouri